The Sir George-Étienne Cartier Parkway, formerly known as the Rockcliffe Parkway, is a parkway in Ottawa, Ontario, Canada.

Route description
The parkway begins at the end of Sussex Drive and follows the Ottawa River, through Rockcliffe Park and past the Canada Aviation Museum. About 200 metres after passing Lower Duck Island, it turns towards the south, passing over Regional Road 174. It ends at the intersection between St. Joseph Boulevard and Bearbrook Road.

Being a federal roadway, the parkway is patrolled by the RCMP instead of the Ottawa Police Service. The posted speed limit is  throughout its length.

History
In 2015, the Rockliffe Parkway was renamed to honour one of Canada's Fathers of Confederation, Sir George-Étienne Cartier.

See also
 Rockcliffe Park, Ontario
 Vanier, Ontario
 National Capital Commission
 Aviation Parkway

References

Roads in Ottawa
Parkways in Ontario